Palo (IPA: [pɐ'loʔ]), officially the Municipality of Palo, is a 3rd class municipality in the province of Leyte, Philippines. According to the 2020 census, it has a population of 76,213 people, making it the most populous municipality (non-city) in the province.

The municipality is the seat of most government departments, bureaus and regional offices of Region VIII, although some are situated at the neighboring city of Tacloban. The municipality is also home to the offices of the ecclesiastical government of the Archdiocese of Palo; the archbishop's residence; as well as the secondary, tertiary and theology seminaries of the archdiocese.

On March 17, 2022, the new Leyte Provincial Capitol in Palo was inaugurated by President Rodrigo Duterte, officially moving the seat of provincial government to the municipality pending an enabling law changing the provincial capital from the current highly urbanized city of Tacloban.

Etymology
According to existing records those who went to Kutay after the tribal war in Bunga were all equipped with palo, a sort of club for fighting or self-protection. Being the settlement of a tribe with palos, this is likely the reason why the community was known as "Palo".

However, the late Justice Norberto Romualdez, in an issue of Noli Me Tangere, a Tacloban-based newspaper of that time, asserted on June 9, 1909, that this town was named Palo because of its many carpenters sporting hammers (mazo or palo).

Believers in superstition and the supernatural ascribe the origin of the Palo name to the town's experience during pre-Spanish time often being visited by typhoons every eight (walo) days. They called the phenomenon walo-walo, hence walo-palo (eight-hammer).

History
The first settlers of Palo were the tribes Panganuron, Kadampog, Manlangit, Kamagung, Kawaring, Kabalhin, Kumagang Maglain, Bilyo and Dilyo. They lived peacefully in an area resembling the shape of a bridge in what is now Barrio Bunga (present-day San Joaquin), which spanned an area on both sides of the river bearing the same name. As the population increased, tribal feuds would cause the people to disperse. Survivors would settle in Payapay, and others in Canpetik. The bulk went to Kutay. Those in Kutay would eventually establish the town of Palo.

Barangay and pueblo 
The settlers in Kutay moved to Bangon river and there started the first barrio, Barangay de Palo, in 1521. Barangay de Palo would then become Pueblo de Palo in 1768. Its first elected gobernadorcillo was Capitan Balasabas. The first curate was R. P. Fray Matias Rosel, O.S.A., an Augustinian friar from Andalucia, Spain.

The Missions

In October 1596, the Jesuit Frs. Cristobal Jimenez and Francisco Encinas left Dulag traversing to Palo along the eastern coasts They were accompanied by principales Don Alonso Ambuyao and four others. They found there only two small houses used by the two servants of the encomenderos. A few boys that attended the mission schools in Dulag welcomed the two priests and taught them the dialect. These missionaries opened the first school in Palo and taught the children to play the flute. Later when Fr. Encinas was called to Carigara, Fr. Jimenez carried on alone until Bro. Miguel Gomez arrived to help him.

Fr. Jimenez learned enough of the local language to be understood but his influence was limited in "his mission area" to only a few. The people probably suspected him of being a tax collector. For a long time the natives avoided him and resisted all his attempts at friendship. Nothing he did or offered to do for them seemed to breakdown their distrust him and he was distressed and worried at their antipathy.

In his rounds of the villages, he noticed that there were many sick of which the greater the number succumbed to diseases for lack of medical attention. This observation gave him an idea. At that time, medical service was very expensive and available only to families of means for they alone could afford to pay work animals, slaves, or the equivalent of the patient's ransom. if he were captured.

Palo is well known as the site of Gen. Douglas MacArthur's return to the Philippines together with Philippine and American military forces after a period of exile in 1944. Hill 522, a hill located near the town center, was the site of fierce fighting between Allied and Japanese forces during the Second World War. The metropolitan cathedral of the archdiocese, located right across Palo's municipal hall, was used as a hospital for wounded Filipino and American forces. A memorial now stands at the beach site where MacArthur and his troops landed, locally known as MacArthur Park. The first Gabaldon Building is also situated in Barangay San Joaquin, Palo, Leyte. It was inaugurated by President Sergio Osmeña.

Palo was also once the capital of Leyte. The town's Purissima Bridge was the first steel bridge built in the province.

In 1957, sitio Campitic was converted into a barrio, while barrio Baras-Candahug was divided into two: Baras and Candahug. Barrio Malirong was renamed as Libertad.

Typhoon Haiyan 
On November 8, 2013, Palo was severely struck by Typhoon Haiyan (Yolanda), which destroyed a large portion of Eastern Visayas and killed a number of residents in the town. On January 17, 2015, Pope Francis visited the town as part of his papal visit to the Philippines to meet with the surviving victims of the typhoon. He also blessed the Pope Francis Center for the Poor and met with priests, seminarians, other religious figures, and surviving victims of the typhoon at the Palo Cathedral before leaving Leyte.

Geography
The municipality is located in the north-eastern part of the province of Leyte, 8 miles from the capital city of Tacloban.

Barangays
Palo is politically subdivided into 33 barangays.

Climate

Demographics

Literacy rate in Palo is 99.5%.

The town's native language is Waray-Waray, the major language and lingua franca in the Eastern Visayas region.

Religion
Palo is the seat of the ecclesiastical province, the Archdiocese, where the Roman Catholic archbishop resides in Bukid Tabor. One can also find the archdiocese's Metropolitan Cathedral in Palo. Meanwhile, Palo is also a seedbed of vocations to the priesthood with the Sacred Heart Seminary and the St. John the Evangelist School of Theology. Two Paloan nuns also became Superior Generals in their respective congregations. To date, there are 158 ordained priests and 106 nuns from the town alone.

Economy

Palo is the seat of the 6.8-hectare Leyte Information and Communications Technology (ICT) Park and the 22-hectare Leyte Mikyu Economic Zone. The Leyte ICT Park hosts two BPOs while the Leyte Mikyu Ecozone is undergoing development.

The town's historic municipal building was the former seat of the Provincial Government of Leyte.

Agriculture is the municipality's dominant industry. The area produces and ferments the local coconut wine called tuba.

Tourism

MacArthur Landing Memorial National Park
Guinhangdan Hill, a destination of Holy Week pilgrims. The hill is now a forest reserve.
Japanese Shrine in Barangay Caloogan
Red Beach - The landmark that has brought Palo to the annals of world history is the Red Beach, in barangay Candahug, where Gen. Douglas MacArthur first landed to liberate the Philippines from the Japanese occupation on October 20, 1944.
WW2 Memorial for the Filipino Soldiers
Palo Metropolitan Cathedral
Palo Binangalan coral reefs
Palo Mangrove Reservation (open season for duck hunting whole year round)
Palo Municipal Library and Heritage Museum
Korean Park

Education

Private
Saint Paul School of Professional Studies
Sacred Heart Seminary
St. John The Evangelist School of Theology
Palo Angelicum
St. Mary's Academy of Palo, Inc.
St. Augustine College of Practical Nursing
Bethel International School
Zion Bible College
AMA Computer College Tacloban
ELA English Language Academy
Alpha-Omega Learning Center
St. Scholastica's College, Tacloban

Public

Notable personalities

Francisco Alvarado - Waray-language poet and playwright
Ely Capacio - basketball player and coach
Glenn Capacio - basketball player and coach
Vicente I. de Veyra - Waray-language anthologist and poet
Iluminado Lucente - Waray-language playwright
Carmen Pedrosa - journalist and author
Leopoldo Petilla - former governor of Leyte

References

External links

 [ Philippine Standard Geographic Code]
Philippine Census Information
Local Governance Performance Management System

Municipalities of Leyte (province)
1768 establishments in the Spanish Empire
Populated places established in 1768